Chow may refer to:

 Selected set of nutrients fed to animals subjected to laboratory testing
 Chow Chow, a dog breed 
 A slang term for food in general (such as in the terms "chow down" or "chow hall")
 Chow test, a statistical test for detecting differences between trends in time series
 Chow (unit), an obsolete unit of mass in the pearl trade in Mumbai
 Chow (website), a popular online food discussion site
 Chow, an alternate name for the star Beta Serpentis
 Mr. Chow, an upscale Chinese restaurant chain
 Chow (surname), an English surname, as well as a Latin-alphabet spelling of various Chinese surnames
 The Chinese word 炒 (stir-fry) as in chow mein

See also 
 Ciao
 Chew (disambiguation)
 Chao (disambiguation)